Pickling salt is a salt that is used mainly for canning and manufacturing pickles. It is sodium chloride, as is table salt, but unlike most brands of table salt, it does not contain iodine or any anti caking products added. A widely circulated legend suggested that iodisation caused the brine of pickles to change color. This is false; however, some anti-caking agents are known to collect at the bottom of the jars or cause the brine to cloud, a minor aesthetic issue. Pickling salt is very fine-grained, to speed up dissolving in water to create a brine, so it is useful for solutions needing salt.

Other uses 
Pickling salt has applications other than pickling. It can be used in place of table salt, although it can cake. A solution to this would be to add a few grains of rice to the salt, or to bake it (which draws the moisture out), and then break it apart. Pickling salt sticks well to food, so it can be used in place of popcorn salt, which also has fine grains.

References 

Edible salt
Food preservation
Salt
salt